Virginia Borra Toledo de Jiménez  has been the Peruvian Minister of Women's Issues and Social Development under President Alan García since September 2010.

References

Year of birth missing (living people)
Living people
Government ministers of Peru
21st-century Peruvian women politicians
21st-century Peruvian politicians
Women government ministers of Peru